Pluneret is a commune in the Morbihan department of Brittany in north-western France. Sainte-Anne station has rail connections to Quimper, Lorient and Vannes.

Population
Inhabitants of Pluneret are called in French Pluneretains.

Geography

The Loc'h river forms the western border of the town and the Bono river forms the eastern border of the town.

Map

Breton language
The municipality launched a linguistic plan through Ya d'ar brezhoneg on 13 July 2006.

In 2008, there was 12.89% of the children attended the bilingual schools in primary education.

See also
Communes of the Morbihan department

References

External links

Official website 

 Mayors of Morbihan Association 

Communes of Morbihan